de Horsey is a British surname and may refer to:

People
Algernon Frederick Rous de Horsey (1827–1922), Knight and Royal Navy Admiral
Spencer Horsey de Horsey (1790–1860), Conservative Party politician in the UK
Spencer Horsey de Horsey (1790 – 20 May 1860), known until 1832 as Spencer Horsey Kilderbee, was a British Tory politician. ...
William Henry Beaumont de Horsey (died 1915), British soldier, son of Spencer Horsey de Horsey and brother of  Algernon Frederick Rous de Horsey and Adeline Louisa Marie de Horsey
Adeline, Countess of Cardigan and Lancastre, born Adeline Louisa Marie de Horsey

Places
De Horsey Island, British Columbia, named for Admiral de Horsey
De Horsey Passage, British Columbia, named for Admiral de Horsey